The 1987 CA-TennisTrophy – Doubles was an event of the 1987 CA-TennisTrophy tennis tournament played on indoor hard courts at the Wiener Stadthalle in Vienna, Austria. Ricardo Acioly and Wojciech Fibak were the defending champions but they competed with different partners that year, Acioly with Luiz Mattar and Fibak with Henri Leconte. Acioly and Mattar lost in the first round to Mark Dickson and Jorge Lozano, as did Fibak and Leconte to Petr Korda and Diego Nargiso.

Unseeded Mel Purcell and Tim Wilkison won the doubles title after a 6–3, 7–5 win in the final  against Emilio Sánchez and Javier Sánchez.

Seeds
Champion seeds are indicated in bold text while text in italics indicates the round in which those seeds were eliminated.
 Jan Gunnarsson /  Anders Järryd (quarterfinals)
 Tomáš Šmíd /  Jonas Svensson (first round)
 Stanislav Birner /  Jaroslav Navrátil (quarterfinals)
 Emilio Sánchez /  Javier Sánchez (final)

Main draw

Draw

References

Doubles

it:Bank Austria Tennis Trophy 1987 - Doppio